TheStreet is a financial news and financial literacy website. It is a subsidiary of The Arena Group. The company provides both free content and subscription services such as Action Alerts Plus a stock recommendation portfolio co-managed by Bob Lang and Chris Versace. Former notable contributors include Jim Cramer, Bob Powell, Aaron Task, Herb Greenberg, and Brett Arends.

History

Early years: going public 
TheStreet, Inc., (formerly, TheStreet.com, Inc.) was co-founded in 1996 by Jim Cramer and Marty Peretz. It became a public company via an initial public offering in May 1999 under the direction of former CEO Kevin English and former CFO Paul Kothari.

Dave Kansas became editor-in-chief in April 1997. Kansas also opened a San Francisco bureau and was a member of the board of directors.

In 1999, at the peak of the dot-com bubble, the market capitalization of the company was $1.7 billion.

Early 2000s: profitability and CEO changes 

In July 2001, David J. Morrow, a former reporter for The New York Times, joined TheStreet, Inc. as its editor-in-chief upon Kansas's departure. Glenn Hall, a former news manager at Freedom Communications (The Orange County Register) and Bloomberg News, replaced Morrow in August 2009. William Inman, former Bloomberg News Editor, replaced Glenn Hall as Editor-in-Chief in March 2012. Janet Guyon, from Fortune, The Wall Street Journal, Bloomberg, and Investopedia replaced William Inman in April 2014.

Under the direction of former chairman and CEO Thomas J. Clarke Jr., the company reported its first annual profit in 2005. Jim Cramer became chairman in October 2008, and served in that capacity until 2011.

Daryl Otte, a long-time company director, became CEO in May 2009 after the resignation of the former CEO, Thomas Clarke. Otte is the founding partner of Montefiore Partners, a venture capital investment fund management firm, and a former executive at media company Ziff Davis. On March 7, 2012, Elisabeth DeMarse was hired as CEO and president, replacing outgoing CEO Daryl Otte.

2007–14: acquisitions 
In April 2007, the company acquired Stockpickr.com. 

In August 2007, the company acquired Corsis, including Promotions.com for $20.7 million. It was sold to management for $3.1 million in December 2009. Executives of the company were later accused of inflating revenues and paid penalties to the U.S. Securities and Exchange Commission.

In November 2007, the company acquired BankingMyWay and RateWatch. In 2008, the company acquired a 13% stake in Geezeo.com, a Boston-based online management tool, with an option to purchase the entire company.

In September 2012, the company acquired The Deal LLC, a media company that covers mergers and acquisitions. The site was sold in February 2019. In April 2013, TheStreet Inc. acquired financial newsletters The DealFlow Report, which covers microcap stocks, including initial public offerings and private placements, and The Life Settlements Report, which focuses on life insurance settlements, as well as the PrivateRaise database.

In November 2014, the company acquired BoardEx for $22.5 million. BoardEx was sold in December 2018.

2010s: pre-sale moves 

In June 2016, David Callaway left USA Today to become CEO of TheStreet.com.

In June 2018, the company sold Rate Watch to S&P Global for $33.5 million.

In February 2019, the company sold The Deal and BoardX for $87 million. David Callaway left as CEO and was replaced by Eric Lundberg.

theMaven/The Arena Group 

In August 2019, the Maven acquired the company for $16.5 million. The company also partnered with Sports Illustrated Fantasy to launch Bull Market Fantasy with Jim Cramer, a channel offering insights, analysis and tips for winning fantasy sports leagues.

During the 2020 COVID-19 pandemic, TheStreet received between $5 million and $10 million in federally backed small business loans from JPMorgan Chase Bank as part of the Paycheck Protection Program. The company stated the loans would allow it to retain 15 jobs.

In 2021, theMaven rebranded itself as The Arena Group.

International activities

Israel
In December 1999, TheStreet entered into an agreement with the Israeli newspaper publisher Haaretz, to invest $2.25 million in exchange for a 25% stake in TheMarker, a new business news website in Hebrew and English. According to the investment agreement, TheStreet.com published selected news and articles on Israeli technology companies from the TheMarker site, and in exchange TheMarker published selected news and articles from TheStreet.com. Following the bursting of the Dot-com bubble the investment in TheMarker was fully impaired.

United Kingdom
In February 2000, TheStreet launched a UK edition (thestreet.co.uk); it closed less than a year later, in November 2000.

References

External links
 

1996 establishments in New York (state)
1999 initial public offerings
2019 mergers and acquisitions
American financial news websites
Companies formerly listed on the Nasdaq
Dot-com bubble
Internet properties established in 1996
Online mass media companies of the United States
Finance websites